Wuta Dombaxe (born 5 April 1986) is an Angolan handball player for club Primeiro de Agosto and the Angolan national team.

She competed at the 2015 World Women's Handball Championship in Denmark.

Achievements 
Carpathian Trophy:
Winner: 2019

References

External links

1986 births
Living people
Angolan female handball players
Olympic handball players of Angola
Handball players at the 2008 Summer Olympics
Handball players at the 2016 Summer Olympics
African Games gold medalists for Angola
African Games medalists in handball
Competitors at the 2015 African Games
Competitors at the 2019 African Games
Handball players from Luanda
Handball players at the 2020 Summer Olympics